Lordship Recreation Ground is a public park in Tottenham, London Borough of Haringey. Access is from Lordship Lane and from opposite Downhills Park in Downhills Park Road. It stretches approximately 750m north-south. The River Moselle runs through the park from west to east and the park also includes a small lake.

Development

The recreation ground opened in 1932, and includes a variety of recreational facilities, including tennis courts and a small theatre. In 1938, the Minister of Transport opened a 'Model Traffic Area', a scaled-down road network where children can use model cars or cycles. The Model Traffic Area was designed to teach children about road traffic in a safe environment.

In 2009, as a result of a public vote, the recreation ground received a £400,000 grant for major refurbishment.

Recognition

In 2013 the park received a Green Flag Award, and won a gold prize in the London in Bloom awards. Lordship Recreation Ground is protected in perpetuity as a Fields in Trust Queen Elizabeth II Field.

References

Parks and open spaces in the London Borough of Haringey
Tottenham